The Hungary national under-21 speedway team is the national under-21 motorcycle speedway team of Hungary and is controlled by the Hungarian Motorcycle Sport Federation. The team was started in the Under-21 World Cup twice and they did not qualify to the final. In 2005 Hungarian riders started with Slovenian riders as a one team.

Competition

See also 
 Hungary national speedway team

External links 
 (hu) Hungarian Motorcycle Sport Federation webside

National speedway teams
Speedway
Speedway